Austroleptis is a genus of snipe flies, and the sole genus in the family Austroleptidae; until 2010, it was placed in the family Rhagionidae. They are small to moderately sized flies of around 3 to 7.7 mm.

The family Austroleptidae was originally created by Nagatomi (1982) as "Austroleptinae", a subfamily of Rhagionidae. It was later proposed that it be raised to family rank by Stuckenburg (2001).

Species
Austroleptis atrata Nagatomi & Nagatomi, 1987 – Neotropic
Austroleptis atriceps Malloch, 1932 – Neotropic
Austroleptis breviflagella Nagatomi & Nagatomi, 1987 – Neotropic
Austroleptis camposgerais Fachin, Santos & Amorim, 2020 – Neotropic
Austroleptis collessi Paramonov, 1962 – Australasia
Austroleptis fulviceps Malloch, 1932 – Neotropic
Austroleptis longirostris Fachin, Santos & Amorim, 2018 – Neotropic
Austroleptis multimaculata Hardy, 1920 – Australasia
Austroleptis papaveroi Fachin, Santos & Amorim, 2018 – Neotropic
Austroleptis penai Nagatomi & Nagatomi, 1987 – Neotropic
Austroleptis rhyphoides Hardy, 1920 – Australasia

References

Austroleptidae
Diptera of Australasia
Diptera of South America
Brachycera genera
Taxa named by George Hudleston Hurlstone Hardy